Richard Monteleone (born March 22, 1963) is an American former professional baseball pitcher and coach.

Career
Monteleone was the first round pick (20th overall) for the Detroit Tigers in the 1982 draft.  However, he began his major league career with the Seattle Mariners in 1987. After a year in Seattle, Monteleone pitched relief for the California Angels from 1988 to 1989, the New York Yankees from 1990 to 1993, the San Francisco Giants in 1994, and the Angels again from 1995 to 1996. In 1995, he started the season in Nippon Professional Baseball (NPB) with the Chunichi Dragons before returning to the Angels.

After his last season as a player in 1996, Monteleone became a coach for the Yankees. While he was most recently with the big league team, Monteleone has also coached Yankees' minor league teams during his tenure. From 2002 to 2004, Monteleone served as the bullpen coach for the Yankees, and was a special pitching instructor for the team from 2005 to 2008. He was fired by the team after the 2008 season.

Personal life
Monteleone and his wife Loretta have two daughters, Chelsea Rhae and Alexis Blake.

References

External links

1963 births
Living people
American expatriate baseball players in Canada
American expatriate baseball players in Japan
American people of Italian descent
Baseball coaches from Florida
Baseball players from Tampa, Florida
Birmingham Barons players
Bristol Tigers players
Calgary Cannons players
California Angels players
Chunichi Dragons players
Columbus Clippers players
Edmonton Trappers players
Evansville Triplets players
Lakeland Tigers players
Major League Baseball bullpen coaches
Major League Baseball pitchers
Nashville Sounds players
Nippon Professional Baseball pitchers
New York Yankees coaches
New York Yankees players
San Francisco Giants players
Seattle Mariners players
Vancouver Canadians players